The Champion Stakes is a greyhound racing competition held annually at Shelbourne Park in Ringsend, Dublin, Ireland.  

It is a prestigious competition in the Irish racing greyhound racing calendar and was inaugurated in 1979.

Past winners

Venues & Distances
1979–1979 (Shelbourne 525y)
1980–1987 (Shelbourne 575y)
1988–present (Shelbourne 550y)

Sponsors
1986–1987 (Respond)
1991–1992 (Febo)
2005–2009 (BoyleSports)
2010–2013 (Townview Foods)
2014–2014 (Hamilton Architects)
2015–2016 (Doire Construction)
2017–present (BoyleSports)

References

Greyhound racing competitions in Dublin (city)
Recurring sporting events established in 1979
Summer events in the Republic of Ireland
1979 establishments in Ireland